Jayal is a census town and tehsil headquarters in the Nagaur district of Rajasthan state. The town is located 50 km away from Nagaur. One of the oldest Stone Age civilization contemporary to bagor end tilwada.

Geography
It has an average elevation of 296 metres (974 feet).

Demographics
 India census, Jayal had a population of 12,218. Males constitute 6,258 of the population and females 5,960.

Arora

References

Cities and towns in Nagaur district